Lomechusini is a tribe of rove beetles. It is generally small, but includes some fairly large genera such as Zyras.

Subtribes
 Lomechusina
 Myrmedoniina

Genera incertae sedis
 Apalonia
 Bothronotoxenus
 Daccordiusa
 Ecitocala
 Pella
 Platyusa
 Trisporusa

Genera
These 202 genera belong to the tribe Lomechusini:

 Abothrus Pace, 1991
 Acanthastilbus Cameron, 1939
 Aenictocleptis Kistner & Jacobson, 1975
 Aenictonia Wasmann, 1900
 Aenictophila Seevers, 1965
 Aenictozyras Kistner & Jacobson, 1975
 Allardiana Levasseur, 1966
 Allodinarda Wasmann, 1909
 Allodonota Pace, 2009
 Amaurodera Fauvel, 1905 c g
 Amazoncharis Pace, 1990
 Amblyoponiphilus Oke, 1933
 Anepipleuronia Bernhauer, 1929
 Ankaratraella Pace, 1999
 Anommatochara (Wasmann, 1915)
 Anopsapterus Lecoq, 1988
 Anthropeltodonia Bernhauer, 1937
 Apalonia Casey, 1906 i c g b
 Apteranillus Fairmaire, 1854
 Apteraphaenops Jeannel, 1907
 Asheidium Santiago-Jiménez, 2010
 Astilbides Wasmann, 1916
 Athexenia Pace, 2000
 Aulacocephalonia (Bernhauer, 1928)
 Borneozyras Pace, 2002
 Bothriocrata Pace, 1993
 Brachypteronia Bernhauer, 1929
 Brachysipalia (Blackwelder, 1952)
 Camerouniella Levasseur, 1967
 Cantaloubeia Levasseur, 1966
 Catarractodes Strand, 1928
 Cephaplakoxena Pace, 1998 c g
 Conradsia Bernhauer, 1942
 Creodonia (Wasmann, 1915)
 Dabra Olliff, 1886
 Dabrosoma Lea, 1910
 Daccordiusa Pace, 2005
 Degalliera Kistner, 1993
 Delgadoidium Santiago-Jiménez, 2010
 Dentazyras Kistner, 1997
 Deroleptus (Bernhauer, 1915)
 Dinocoryna Casey, 1893 i c g b
 Dinusella Bernhauer, 1908
 Diplopleurus Bernhauer, 1915 c g
 Doratoporus Wasmann, 1893
 Dromacamatus Bruch, 1933
 Dromanomma Wasmann, 1916
 Dromeciton Fauvel, 1904
 Drugia Blackwelder, 1952
 Drusilla Leach in Samouelle, 1819 i c g b
 Drusillota Casey, 1906
 Dysamblys Pace, 1999
 Ecitana Seevers, 1965
 Ecitocala Frank in Frank and Thomas, 1981 i c g
 Ecitocerus Borgmeier, 1949
 Ecitocryptodes Seevers, 1965
 Ecitocryptus Borgmeier, 1930
 Ecitodiscus Borgmeier, 1949
 Ecitodonia Seevers, 1965
 Ecitoglossa Borgmeier, 1958
 Ecitonia Wasmann, 1894
 Ecitonilla Wasmann, 1894
 Ecitopelta Borgmeier, 1949
 Ecitophila Wasmann, 1890
 Ecitophiletus Borgmeier, 1932
 Ecitophrura Reichensperger, 1939
 Ecitoplectus Borgmeier, 1931
 Ecitopolites Borgmeier, 1949
 Ecitotyphlus Borgmeier, 1949
 Ecitoxenidia Wasmann, 1909 i c g b
 Eidozyras Pace, 2010
 Euryalusa Pace, 1984
 Eurydiotyphla Pace, 1986
 Eurydonota Pace, 2009
 Falagonia Sharp, 1883
 Falagonilla Reichensperger, 1939
 Gallardoia Bruch, 1924
 Gapia Blackwelder, 1952
 Glossodonota Pace, 2009
 Gramminopleurus Bernhauer, 1942
 Gryptaulacus (Bernhauer, 1937)
 Haplomyrmemonia Pace, 1986
 Havilandoxenus Kistner, 1971
 Heteroporus Cameron, 1939
 Hodotermophilus Naomi & Terayama, 1986
 Homalodonia (Bernhauer, 1936)
 Iheringocantharus Bernhauer, 1912
 Kakodaimonia Bernhauer, 1929
 Katanganella Levasseur, 1966
 Kenyanella Levasseur, 1966
 Kolwezia Levasseur, 1966
 Kompsodonota Pace, 2009
 Labidilla Borgmeier, 1949
 Labidoculex Reichensperger, 1936
 Leleupidiella Jarrige, 1953
 Leptogenonia Maruyama, 2010
 Leptogenopapus Hlaváč & Janda, 2009
 Leptogenoxenus Kistner, 1975
 Limulodilla Kistner, 1970
 Lomechusa Gravenhorst, 1806 c g
 Lomechusoides Tottenham, 1939 c g
 Longipedisymbia Kistner, 1970
 Longipedoxenus Kistner, 1970
 Lornechusula Brauns, 1925
 Macrogerodonia (Bernhauer, 1941)
 Madecazyras Scheerpeltz, 1961
 Malaiseium Scheerpeltz, 1965
 Malaybergius Kistner, 1993
 Manausdota Pace, 2008
 Manikaella Levasseur, 1967
 Maschwitzia Kistner, 1989
 Methneria Bernhauer, 1915
 Methnerotherium Bernhauer, 1929
 Microdonia Casey, 1893 i c g b
 Mimaenictus Kistner & Jacobson, 1975
 Mimoplandria Cameron, 1950
 Monobothrus Pace, 1990
 Myrmechusa Wasmann, 1908
 Myrmechusina Cameron, 1926
 Myrmecopella Kistner & McNairn, 1991
 Myrmecoxenia Lynch, 1884
 Myrmedonota Cameron, 1920 g b
 Myrmoecia Mulsant & Rey, 1874 i c g b
 Neocamacopalpus Klimaszewski, 1982
 Neosmectonia Jacobson & Kistner, 1983
 Neowroughtonilla Kistner, 1989
 Newtonidium Santiago-Jiménez, 2010
 Ocyplanus Fauvel, 1899
 Orphnebius Motschulsky, 1858 c g
 Oxylidia Pace, 1993
 Pachorhopala (Bernhauer, 1915)
 Papuanusa Pace, 2000
 Paramyrmoecia (Scheerpeltz, 1974)
 Paraporus Bernhauer, 1929
 Parastilbus Bernhauer, 1933
 Parawroughtonilla Maruyama, 2010
 Pedinopleurus Cameron, 1939 c g
 Pella Stephens, 1835 i c g b
 Peltodonia (Bernhauer, 1936)
 Periergopus Fenyes, 1921
 Pheidologitonetes Cameron, 1939
 Philastilbus Bernhauer, 1929
 Philusina Wasmann, 1893
 Platyastilbus Scheerpeltz, 1965
 Platyusa Casey, 1885 i c g b
 Plesiadda Pace, 1986
 Porus Westwood, 1840
 Procantonnetia Kistner & Jacobson, 1975
 Propinquitas Last, 1977
 Pseudastilbus Cameron, 1950
 Pseudodinusa Bernhauer, 1912
 Pseudodrusilla Bernhauer, 1933
 Pseudofalagonia Santiago-Jiménez, 2010
 Pseudopachorhopala Levasseur, 1966
 Pseudoporus Wasmann, 1893
 Pseudothamiaraea Cameron, 1923
 Quarternio Last, 1963
 Rhopalybia Cameron, 1937
 Rhoptrodinarda Brauns, 1914
 Salutoporus Last, 1977
 Scotodonia Wasmann, 1894
 Serikodonota Pace, 2009
 Sharpidium Santiago-Jiménez, 2010
 Smectonia Patrizi, 1948
 Stenocyplanus Jacobson & Kistner, 1983
 Stenopleurus Kistner, 1997
 Steysborgia Kistner & Jacobson, 1975
 Stichodonia (Bernhauer, 1928)
 Strabocephalium Bernhauer, 1911
 Sumatrilla Pace, 2010
 Synthoracastilbus Scheerpeltz, 1957
 Termitognathus Borgmeier, 1959
 Termitonusa Borgmeier, 1950
 Termitophagus Silvestri, 1946
 Termitosymbia Seevers, 1957
 Termitozyras Seevers, 1957
 Termophidoholus Naomi & Hirono, 1996 c g
 Terrecorvonia Last, 1962
 Tetrabothrus Bernhauer, 1915 c g
 Tetradonella Jacobson & Kistner, 1998
 Tetradonia Wasmann, 1894 i c g b
 Tetralophodes Bernhauer, 1922
 Thayeridium Santiago-Jiménez, 2010
 Thlibopleurus Bernhauer, 1915
 Thoracastilbus Scheerpeltz, 1957
 Togpelenys Kistner, 1989
 Trachydonia (Bernhauer, 1928)
 Trachyota Casey, 1906 i c g
 Trichodonia Wasmann, 1916
 Trisporusa Pace, 2005
 Tropiochara Bernhauer, 1937
 Turcizyras Maruyama, 2006
 Typhlonusa Borgmeier, 1958
 Typhlozyras Jeannel, 1960
 Vertexprorogatio Kistner, 2004
 Wasmannina Mann, 1925
 Weissflogia Kistner, 1997
 Witteia Maruyama & von Beeren, 2010
 Wroughtonilla Wasmann, 1899
 Xenodusa Wasmann, 1894 i c g b
 Xesturida Casey, 1906 i c g b
 Zyras Stephens, 1835 i c g b
 Zyratheta Pace, 2010

Data sources: i = ITIS, c = Catalogue of Life, g = GBIF, b = Bugguide.net

References

Further reading

 

Aleocharinae
Polyphaga tribes